Salford and Eccles is a constituency represented in the House of Commons of the UK Parliament since 2015 by Rebecca Long-Bailey, a member  of the Labour Party.

History
The constituency was created following the Boundary Commission's Fifth Periodic Review of Westminster constituencies (ended 2008), and was first contested at the 2010 general election. The review led to the loss of one seat in Greater Manchester, and the Salford and Eccles seat covers parts of the previous Salford and Eccles constituencies.

The last MP for Salford was Hazel Blears, whereas the last MP for Eccles was Ian Stewart. Hazel Blears was chosen as the Labour Party candidate to represent the new constituency at the 2010 general election. Following Blears's retirement, Labour member Rebecca Long-Bailey was elected to replace her in 2015.

Constituency profile

In an effort to reignite business development after the wholesale essentials textiles manufacturing industry declined, at the heart of the City of Salford This constituency has undergone significant regeneration since the decline of the textile industry. Salford Quays became Britain's Media City as the home of the BBC and ITV in the North of England and the University of Salford commenced a £150 million redevelopment in 2008. Aside from the flagship MediaCityUK complex whose housing consists of exclusive apartments, the nearby deprived areas such as Weaste and Seedley which are undergoing regeneration. Also in the seat are Swinton, a residential suburb and the administrative headquarters of Salford City Council, and Eccles, though its outskirts are in Worsley and Eccles South.

The constituency and the overall City of Salford voted to Leave the European Union although the Ordsall (Salford Quays) and Eccles wards voted Remain.

In statistics
The constituency consists of a working population whose income is below the national average and higher than average reliance upon social housing.  At the end of 2012 the unemployment rate in the constituency stood as 5.0% of the population claiming jobseekers allowance, compared to the regional average of 4.2%. The borough contributing to the bulk of the seat has a high 44.5% of its population without a car, a close-to-average 23.1% of the population without qualifications and a high 28.9% with level 4 qualifications or above.  In terms of tenure only 37.8% of homes are owned outright or on a mortgage as at the 2011 census across the city.
In 2017, has risen to over 60% for the first time since 1992 for this area, taking into account previous seats. In 2001 the turnout for the previous Salford seat was just 41%, though the national election turnout was also lower than average that year.

Boundaries

The electoral wards included in the Salford and Eccles constituency in the City of Salford are:

 Claremont
 Eccles
 Irwell Riverside
 Langworthy
 Ordsall
 Pendlebury
 Swinton North
 Swinton South
 Weaste and Seedley

Eccles was approximately bisected following the recommendations of the review; for its southern areas see Worsley and Eccles South.

Members of Parliament

Elections

Elections in the 2010s 

* Served as an MP in the 2005–2010 Parliament

See also
List of parliamentary constituencies in Greater Manchester

Notes

References

Parliamentary constituencies in Greater Manchester
Constituencies of the Parliament of the United Kingdom established in 2010
Politics of Salford